Jerry Sardua Barbaso (born 18 April 1988) is a Filipino footballer who plays as a defender for Philippines Football League club Maharlika Manila and the Philippines national team.

Early life
Barbaso was born into an ethnic Cebuano family in Dipolog. Barbaso's father died when he was four. His father's name was Jerry Sr. and his older brother's name is Jerry Jr. so Barbaso is actually the 3rd Jerry in his family.

He did not start playing football at the age of 13. Barbaso graduated from DMC-College Foundation with a degree in managerial accounting in 2009, the same year that he started playing professionally.

Club career
Barbaso played in the United Football League with Laos and Global. He also played for the latter, as Global Cebu in the Philippines Football League (PLF) until 2018 when he moved to Ceres–Negros.

In 2020, Barbaso joined Maharlika F.C.

International career
Barboso made his international debut in the 2010 Long Teng Cup. Barboso was one of the two overage players chosen for the 2012 Hassanal Bolkiah Trophy, where he also captained the team. In August 2013, Barbaso was selected to play in a friendly match against Indonesia. He made his debut coming on for Carli De Murga in an eventual 2–0 defeat.

Personal life
Barboso is good friends with Yu Hoshide, and is known by teammates as a very sociable person. His number, 63, is  testament to his nickname "sixto" which earned in college. He is also well known for his long curly "afro" hair which he sometimes ties in a ponytail.

Honors

National team
Philippine Peace Cup: 2013

Career statistics

Club

References

1988 births
Living people
People from Dipolog
Global Makati F.C. players
Association football defenders
Filipino footballers
Philippines international footballers
Cebuano people
Sportspeople from Zamboanga del Norte
Maharlika F.C. players